Georgios Petsitis (born 11 May 2000) is a Greek professional footballer who plays as a midfielder.

References

2000 births
Living people
Greek footballers
Football League (Greece) players
Gamma Ethniki players
A.P.O. Akratitos Ano Liosia players
Kalamata F.C. players
Association football midfielders
Footballers from Elefsina